St. Paul's Cathedral in London, Ontario, Canada, is the seat of the Diocese of Huron of the Anglican Church of Canada. It was designed in the Gothic revival style by William Thomas and built between 1844 and 1846, replacing the previous church, which was built in 1834 and burned down in 1844. It is the oldest church in the city. Sculptors John Cochrane and Brothers undertook the work on the cathedral's interior.

In 1966, the cathedral commissioned its history to be written by the Rev. Orlo Miller.

Deans of Huron
The dean of Huron is normally also the rector of St Pauls.

 1866–1871: Isaac Hellmuth the first dean and afterwards bishop of Huron and founder of Western University of London, Ontario
 1871–1888: Michael Boomer 
 1888–1903: George Mignon Innes 
 1903–1918: Evans Davis
 1918–1934: L. Norman Tucker 
 1935–1940: Charles E. Jeakins 
 1940–1944: P. N.Harding 
 1944–1948: George Luxton (afterwards Bishop of Huron, 1948)
 1948–1961: R. C.Brown 
 1961–1980: Kenneth B. Keefe 
 1980–1987: Percy O'Driscoll (afterwards Bishop of Huron, 1990)
 1988–2000: Bruce H. W. Howe (afterwards Bishop of Huron, 2000)
 2000–2009: Terry Dance (afterwards Suffragan Bishop of Huron, 2009)
 2010–2015 Kevin Dixon
2015-2016 Interim dean Barry Clarke, retired bishop of Montreal
2016–Present Paul Millward

See also

St Paul's Cathedral, London, England

References

External links

Canada's Historic Places 

Anglican cathedrals in Ontario
Anglican church buildings in Ontario
Buildings and structures in London, Ontario
19th-century Anglican church buildings in Canada
William Thomas (architect) buildings